Anoplokaros is a monospecific genus of ovoviviparous velvet worm containing the single species Anoplokaros keerensis. This species has 15 pairs of legs in both sexes. The type locality of this species is Mount Keira, New South Wales, Australia.

References

Further reading 
 

Onychophorans of Australasia
Onychophoran genera
Monotypic protostome genera
Fauna of New South Wales
Animals described in 1996
Taxa named by Amanda Reid (malacologist)